Oeciacus is a genus of bed bugs in the family Cimicidae. There are at least three described species in Oeciacus.

Species
These three species belong to the genus Oeciacus:
 Oeciacus hirundinis (Lamarck, 1816)
 Oeciacus montandoni Pericart, 1972
 Oeciacus vicarius Horvath, 1912 (American swallow bug)

References

Further reading

 
 

Cimicidae
Hemiptera genera
Taxa named by Carl Stål
Articles created by Qbugbot